The 2022–23 WAC men's basketball season began with practices in October 2022 followed by the start of the 2022–23 NCAA Division I men's basketball season in November 2022. The conference began play in December 2022. This is the WAC's 61st season of basketball. The WAC will compete again with 13 teams with two teams leaving the conference and two teams joining the conference from the prior year. Chicago State turned independent and Lamar moved to the Southland Conference. Southern Utah University joins from the Big Sky Conference and UT Arlington joins from the Sun Belt Conference. Dixie State was also renamed as Utah Tech. Each WAC member will play an 18-game conference schedule. The WAC tournament will be held March 6–11, 2023 at the Orleans Arena in Las Vegas, Nevada.

Pre-season

WAC Media days
The WAC's 2022 men's basketball media day was held on October 18.

WAC Preseason All-Conference
First Team

† Denotes Preseason Player of the Year
Second Team

Regular season

Early season tournaments

Records against other conferences
2022–23 records against non-conference foes:

Regular Season

Record against ranked non-conference opponents
This is a list of games against ranked opponents only (rankings from the AP Poll):

Team rankings are reflective of AP poll when the game was played, not current or final ranking

Rankings

Head coaches

Coaching changes
Only one coaching change was made during the offseason. Greg Heiar was hired on March 27 as the 27th head coach at New Mexico State University to replace Chris Jans who had previously been hired as the head coach at Mississippi State University.

Coaches
Note: Stats shown are before the beginning of the season. Overall and WAC records are from time at current school.

Notes:
 Overall and WAC records, conference titles, etc. are from time at current school and are through the end of the 2021–22 season.
 Records and season totals only include time spent at Division I as head coach.
 NCAA tournament appearances are from time at current school only.
 NCAA Final Fours and Championship include time at other schools.

Post season

WAC tournament

The conference tournament was played from March 7–11, 2022, at Michelob ULTRA Arena and the Orleans Arena in Paradise, Nevada near Las Vegas. The first round was played on March 7 at Michelob ULTRA Arena with the remaining rounds March 8–11 at the Orleans Arena. Twelve of the thirteen members were invited to the tournament. While Tarleton and Utah Tech were ineligible for the NCAA tournament, they were eligible for the WAC tournament.

NCAA tournament

Teams from the conference that were selected to participate:

National Invitation Tournament 
Number from the conference that were selected to participate: 2

College Basketball Invitational 
Number from the conference that were selected to participate: 2

Awards and honors

Players of the week 
Throughout the conference regular season, the WAC offices name a player of the week, and a freshman of the week each Monday.

Totals per school - Players of the week

All-Americans

All-WAC 
First team

 ‡ WAC Player of the Year
 ‡‡ WAC Defensive Player of the Year

Second team

All-Newcomer team

† Newcomer of the Year

All-Defensive team

‡WAC Defensive Player of the Year

Other awards 
Sixth Man of the Year: Dee Barnes, Southern Utah 

Freshman of the Year: Chendall Weaver, UT Arlington 

Coach of the Year: Mark Madsen, Utah Valley

2023 NBA draft

Home game attendance 

Bold – At or exceed capacity; capacity ratios for Seattle U and UTRGV computed based on smaller home arena
†Season high
‡Climate Pledge Arena
‡‡Bert Ogden Arena

References